The 134th Pennsylvania Volunteer Infantry was an infantry regiment in the Union Army during the American Civil War.

History
After a call for volunteers in July 1862 by Andrew Curtin, Governor of Pennsylvania, the 134th Regiment was mustered in for nine months of service. The companies were from the following counties:
 Field Staff 
 Company A – Lawrence County
 Company B – Lawrence County
 Company C – Butler County
 Company D – Lawrence County
 Company E – Beaver County
 Company F – Butler County
 Company G – Butler County
 Company H – Lawrence County
 Company I – Beaver County
 Company K – Butler County
Most of the men had no prior military service. Some had served in the Mexican–American War, but many were fresh recruits. After being trained at Camp Curtin, they were moved to Washington D.C. on August 20, 1862, following the Confederate advance on the capital during the Northern Virginia Campaign. After one day at Washington, they were moved to Arlington Heights, where they engaged in drill and other duties. They joined a brigade with the 91st, 126th, and 129th Pennsylvania regiments, under the command of General Erastus B. Tyler. It was here that the organization of the regiment was completed. For the field officers, Matthew Quay of Beaver County was commissioned as colonel, Edward O'Brien of Lawrence County as lieutenant colonel, and John M. Thompson of Butler County as major.

On August 30, the 134th marched towards Manassas, Virginia, but arrived too late to participate in the Second Battle of Bull Run. The men returned to camp and were put in the defenses. On September 13, Tyler's Brigade, as part of the Third Division, V Corps, marched towards South Mountain in central Maryland. It arrived near Sharpsburg, Maryland, on the 18th, but had arrived too late to participate in the Battle of Antietam.

During the night of the 18th, the Confederate army withdrew into Virginia. Until September 30, the regiment remained near Sharpsburg and drilled. During this time, Colonel Quay was caught typhoid fever and O'Brien took command. In November, the regiment moved to Fredericksburg, Virginia, where it went into camp.

In early December, Quay was forced to resign due to his disease and O'Brien was promoted to colonel, Thompson to lieutenant colonel, and Captain William H. Shaw to major. The 134th fought in the Battle of Fredericksburg on December 13, losing 14 killed, 106 wounded, and 19 missing. Despite his illness, Quay volunteered to serve as an aide to General Tyler throughout the battle, for which he would receive a Medal of Honor in 1888.

The regiment fought in the Battle of Chancellorsville from May 1 to 3 1863, on the left flank of the Union army. Total casualties were 48 men killed, wounded, and missing. The enlistments of the men expired soon after the battle, and the 134th was mustered out in Harrisburg on May 26, 1863.

Service
Organized at Camp Curtin.
Sent to Washington, D.C. August 20.
Duty at Sharpsburg, Md., till October 30.
Reconnaissance to Smithfield, W. Va., October 16–17.
Movement to Falmouth, Va., October 30-November 19.
Battle of Fredericksburg, Va., December 12–15.
Burnside's 2nd Campaign January 20–24, 1863.
Duty at Falmouth, Va., till April 27.
Chancellorsville Campaign April 27-May 6.
Battle of Chancellorsville May 1–5.
Mustered out May 26, 1863.

Casualties
Killed and mortally wounded: 4 officers, 38 enlisted men
Wounded: ? officers, ? enlisted men
Died of disease: 1 officer, 66 enlisted men
Captured or missing: ? officers, ? enlisted men
Total: ? officers, ? enlisted men

References
 Dyer, Frederick H., A Compendium of the War of the Rebellion Compiled and Arranged from Official Records of the Federal and Confederate Armies, Reports of the Adjutant Generals of the Several States, the Army Registers, and Other Reliable Documents and Sources. Des Moines, Iowa: The Dyer Publishing Company, 1908.
Pennsylvania in the Civil War
PA Civil War Medal of Honor Recipients from York County

Further reading

External links
Lawrence County, PA newspaper article about 134th
Biography of Matthew S. Quay

Units and formations of the Union Army from Pennsylvania
1862 establishments in Pennsylvania
Military units and formations established in 1862
Military units and formations disestablished in 1863